The 1974 Senior League World Series took place from August 12–17 in Gary, Indiana, United States. Pingtung, Taiwan defeated Charlotte, North Carolina in the championship game. It was Taiwan's third straight championship.

This year saw the tournament field reduced, from ten, to eight teams.

Teams

Results

References

Senior League World Series
Senior League World Series
Baseball competitions in Indiana
Sports in Gary, Indiana
1974 in sports in Indiana